Rafael Raich was a Spanish footballer who played as a forward for FC Espanya and the Catalan national team. The dates of his birth and death are unknown.

Biography
Born in Catalonia, he signed for FC Espanya along with Agustín Cruella Tena in 1915, for whom he won the Catalan championship in 1916–17.

He played several matches for the Catalonia national team during the 1910s, however, due to the little statistical rigor that the newspapers had at that time, the exact amount of caps he earned is unknown. He was part of the Catalan side that won the second edition of the Prince of Asturias Cup in 1916, an inter-regional competition organized by the RFEF.

Honours

Club
FC Espanya
Catalan championship:
Champions (1): 1916-17

International
Catalonia
Prince of Asturias Cup:
Champions (1): 1916

References

Year of birth missing
Year of death missing
Spanish footballers
Footballers from Catalonia
Association football forwards
Catalonia international footballers